Carabus monticola is a species of beetle from family Carabidae, found in France, Italy, and Switzerland.

References

melancholicus
Beetles described in 1826